Louis Jacob may refer to:
 Louis Léon Jacob (1768–1854), French admiral and government minister
 Ludovicus a S. Carolo (1608–1670), French Carmelite scholar, writer and bibliographer

See also
Louis Jacobs (disambiguation)